, known professionally as  or Matt Rose, is a Japanese media personality, model, and musician.

Early life

His father is former professional baseball player Masumi Kuwata; his older brother Masaki is also a former professional baseball player, and his grandfather is professional golfer Izumi Kuwata.

When he was 7 years old, his father began playing piano as a form of rehabilitation; at this time, Kuwata began to teach himself to play piano and violin. However, in elementary school, his father pushed him to continue playing baseball until graduation, in the hope that he would grow to eventually like it and continue. This did not happen; with the support of his mother, Maki, he promptly quit baseball after completing the sixth grade in order to pursue his interest in music. While his older brother appeared to have inherited their father's passion for the sport, Kuwata was reportedly disinterested in it. His mother wrote a book about the experience, titled  (You're Fine the Way You Are: Growing Children's Self Esteem, Raising Children in the Kuwata House). On October 2, 2022, he made a TV appearance alongside his mother on Shuukan Sanma to Matsuko.

He joined his school's orchestra, where he played drums, flute, and alto sax. In high school, he went on to Horikoshi Gakuen, where he played alto as well as soprano saxophone in wind orchestra. As leader of the orchestra,  he won first place in the Tokyo High School Wind Orchestra Competition. He went on to J. F. Oberlin University by way of recommendation for his instrument ability, and studied abroad in America for his fourth year of university. Upon his return to Japan, he graduated and immediately began his activities as a tarento.

Beauty

Kuwata is known for his whiteface makeup style, sometimes referred to as "Matt-ka" (マット化, "Matt-ifying"). Domestic Japanese media has described his appearance as that of a "foreign prince" (domestic Japanese media often misuses the word "foreign" to mean "white") or "living doll", as well as criticized him for looking "unnatural". Kuwata himself says that he does not consider the "unnatural" remarks to be insulting; that in contrast of the approachable idol image, he wants to be seen as unreachable, like theme park characters he had idolized. He says that, through his appearance, he wishes to convey the message that "your life is your own". He has declined to comment on any rumors of plastic surgery. He does, however, admit to the use of image editing software, including BeautyPlus and Adobe Lightroom.

In 2019, he was awarded "Most Newsworthy Person in Beauty 2019" at the Bestcosmetics Awards 2019, hosted by VoCE Magazine.

In October 2021, cosmetics company Daiya Corporation launched an official website for Emrose, a "total beauty brand" produced by Kuwata, featuring skincare products planned and designed by him, with his clear and whitened skin in mind as part of the concept. Featured ingredients include guaiazulene and camomile oil. A pop-up shop for it was opened in Shinjuku Isetan, at which Kuwata made an appearance and was approached by people of a wide variety of ages. The product "Blue Relief Peeling Pad", released on July 8th, 2022, sold out completely in one week. The liquid cosmetics have sold out and been re-released multiple times. 

On June 29, 2022, a 34-minute video demonstrating his skin care and makeup routine was featured by Vogue Japan online, featuring products from his brand Emrose.

Despite his use of whiteface, which he refers to as "Westerner make-up (西洋人風メイク)" or erroneously describes as "foreigner make-up (外国人風メイク)", Kuwata has explicitly stated that he "has absolutely no desire to be a white person".

Music

On December 26, 2019, he released his first music single, "Yoso mo Tsukanai Story". His next single, "Unconditional Love", was released on September 30, 2020.

In May 2021, he made a guest appearance in the music video for Kis-My-Ft2 member Kento Senga's solo single, "Buzz".

Commercials

In September 2019, he filmed his first starring role in a commercial, advertising Black Thunder candy bars. In November 2019, he and his father starred in a commercial for Y! Mobile together.

In March 2020, he starred in a Mouse Computers web commercial, alongside The Fuccons.

In April 2020, he starred in a web campaign for an Earth Corporation insect repelling device.

In September 2021, he co-starred in a commercial for Uber Eats Japan, in which he is shown making up Japanese actress Nanako Matsushima in whiteface as well. In the same month, he also appeared in a web commercial for AvanTime Tone Shot Cream, becoming a "beauty ambassador" for the brand.

TV Appearances
Honma Dekka!? TV (Fuji TV Keiretsu, July 27, 2022) 
Nonstop (Fuji TV Keiretsu, January 14, 2022)
Sekai Marumie! TV Tokusō-bu 2 Hour Special, September 28th, 2020 Nihon TV Keiretsu)
Shuukan Sanma to Matsuko(TBS Kei, October 2, 2022)

Other appearances

Kuwata guest-starred in a limited campaign that ran as part of Makai Senki Disgaea RPG from October 8th to 22nd, 2020, titled Bishoujo Sentai Lovely V: Matt to Fushigi na Kagami. He was featured in a special battle, special mission, and login bonus, and designed two items for the event himself.

References

External links
Official website

1994 births
21st-century Japanese male musicians
Living people
Japanese television personalities
Japanese entertainers
Japanese male models
People from Setagaya
J. F. Oberlin University alumni